Yousef Rashid (born June 8, 1978) is a Saudi football player who plays a right-back for Al-Ansar.

References

1978 births
Living people
Saudi Arabian footballers
Al-Ansar FC (Medina) players
Al-Hazem F.C. players
Al-Qadsiah FC players
Al-Tai FC players
Al-Taawoun FC players
Al-Nahda Club (Saudi Arabia) players
Ohod Club players
Saudi First Division League players
Saudi Professional League players
Saudi Second Division players
Association football defenders